The Sicilian Regional Assembly is the legislative body of Sicily. While it has a long history as an autonomous entity, the modern Region of Sicily was established by Royal Decree on 15 May 1946, before the Italian Republic. The Regional Assembly has the widest legislative power in Italy and is the only regional assembly to have the title of "parliament" whose members are called "deputies" as are those in Rome. Seventy deputies are elected every five years in the nine provinces.

History 

The Sicilian Parliament is arguably considered the oldest parliament in the world (together with that Icelandic and Faroese, which, however, had no decision-making powers, a fact which makes the Sicilian Parliament the first in the modern sense). In 1097 came the first conference in Mazara del Vallo convened by Roger I the Great Count of an initially itinerant parliament.

Since 1130 the House seat is the Palazzo dei Normanni in Palermo.

The election of a democratic Parliament came at the end of World War II. To defuse the powerful separatist movement in Sicily, the Sicilian Regional Council was established in February 1945. After the regional elections of April 20, 1947, this body was reborn as the Sicilian Regional Assembly on May 25, 1947.  In 1997 the Assembly celebrated its 900th anniversary. On 26 January 2008, for the first time in republican history, the Assembly was dissolved by the resignation of Regional President Salvatore Cuffaro.

Seat 
The Assembly has its seat in the prestigious Palazzo dei Normanni (Norman Palace) in Palermo. It was constructed in the 11th century following the Norman conquest of Sicily and has seen several expansion and renovation operations. It hosted the kings of Sicily, including Frederick II of Swabia, and later the viceroy of Spain.  Adjacent is the Palatine Chapel. The tourist services in the Palace and the Palatine Chapel are entrusted to the Foundation Frederick II.

Composition 
The Assembly is composed of seventy deputies elected by direct universal suffrage every five years by voters in Sicily. Until 2017, the members were 90. From 25 May 1947 to now there were XVII legislatures, initially for a period of four years, while in 1971 five years. For the first time the XIV^ legislature ended prematurely in 2008 due to the resignation of the President of the region, Salvatore Cuffaro.
The actual electoral mechanism, which includes a barrier of 5% of the list, provide for the provincial colleges of 62 members plus the president-elect and a candidate for president most votes among the non-elect. The remaining six seats are allocated to the majority share to reach 42 members.

Electoral system

From 1947 until 1996, the Sicilian Regional Assembly had 90 regional deputies elected with the proportional system on the basis of the nine provincial constituencies, while the president of the region and the assessors were elected by the deputies. In the 2001 election, the Sicilian regional presidency became a directly elected office, and the Tatarella Law was applied temporarily to elect 72 deputies from the provincial constituencies, while 18 came from the list of the elected president and one for the second classified among the president candidates, with the threshold at 4 percent.

A new electoral law was adopted in 2005. This law created a mixed electoral system with the following parameters:

80 out of 90 deputies are chosen through a proportional system in the provincial constituencies, with an electoral barrier of 5% on a regional basis for each party;
proportional seats are distributed only at the provincial level;
the distribution at the provincial level (proportional to the population and therefore variable each term) was: 7 seats for the province of Agrigento, 4 for Caltanissetta, 17 for Catania, 3 for Enna, 11 for Messina, 20 for Palermo, 5 for Ragusa, 6 for Syracuse, 7 for Trapani;
up to 9 deputies (including the President) are elected with the regional list of the presidential candidate to reach the threshold of 54 majority seats;
1 seat is reserved for the second-place finisher in the presidential election.

With the modification of the law in 2013, the number of deputies dropped to 70 beginning with the regional election of 2017. The selection process in this current system has the following parameters:

62 out of 70 deputies are chosen through a proportional system in provincial constituencies, with an electoral barrier of 5% on a regional basis for each party;
proportional seats are distributed only at the provincial level;
the distribution at the provincial level (proportional to the population and therefore variable every term) is: 6 seats for the province of Agrigento, 3 for Caltanissetta, 13 for Catania, 2 for Enna, 8 for Messina, 16 for Palermo, 4 for Ragusa, 5 for Syracuse, 5 for Trapani;
7 deputies (including the President) are elected with the regional list of the presidential candidate. 
1 seat is reserved for the second-place finisher in the presidential election.

Political groups
The Sicilian Regional Assembly is currently composed of the following political groups:

Presidents (1947–present)

See also
Regional council (Italy)
Sicilian Parliament
List of presidents of Sicily

References

External links

 
Regional
1947 establishments in Italy
Palazzo dei Normanni